Alejandro Falla was the defending champion, but decided not to participate this year.
Marc Gicquel won this tournament, by defeating 5th seed Stéphane Bohli 7–6(7–6), 4–6, 6–1 in the final.

Seeds

Draw

Finals

Top half

Bottom half

References
 Main Draw
 Qualifying Draw

Open de Rennes - Singles
2010 Singles